...The Beat Goes On is the first full-length album by the Philadelphia hardcore band Blacklisted.

Track listing

References

2005 albums
Blacklisted (band) albums
Deathwish Inc. albums